Kelvin Odenigbo (13 April 2001 – 5 June 2021) was a Nigerian professional footballer. In 2021, he joined Vitebsk on loan from NAF Rockets.

References

External links 
 

2001 births
2021 deaths
Nigerian footballers
Association football forwards
Nigerian expatriate footballers
Expatriate footballers in Belarus
Nigerian expatriate sportspeople in Belarus
NAF Rockets F.C. players
FC Vitebsk players
Deaths by drowning